Rúben dos Santos Gato Alves Dias (born 14 May 1997) is a Portuguese professional footballer who plays as a centre-back for  club Manchester City and the Portugal national team. Considered one of the best defenders in the world, he is known for his defensive prowess, leadership, and aerial ability.

Dias came through Benfica's youth academy. He began playing for Benfica B in 2015 and was promoted to the first-team in 2017, and was named the Primeira Liga's Young Player of the Year. The following season, Dias won the league title in the 2018–19 season with Benfica and later the Supertaça Cândido de Oliveira during the 2019–20 season, while also being named in the Primeira Liga's Team of the Year, making over 100 appearances in the process. He signed for Premier League club Manchester City in September 2020 for a reported fee of €68 million, becoming the second-highest fee for a Portuguese player leaving the domestic league. Dias won the league title and EFL Cup in his first season, while also reaching UEFA Champions League final. He was also named FWA Footballer of the Year, Manchester City Player of the Year, Premier League Player of the Season and the UEFA Champions League Defender of the Season in 2021.

Dias is a former Portugal youth international, representing his country at under-16, under-17, under-19, under-20 and under-21 levels. He made his senior international debut in 2018, being chosen in Portugal's squads for the 2018 World Cup, 2019 UEFA Nations League Finals, UEFA Euro 2020 and 2022 World Cup; he won the 2019 tournament on home soil, while being named in the team of the tournament and man of the match in the final.

Early life
Born and raised in Amadora, Dias has an older brother Ivan, who is also a professional football player, who nicknamed him "Ruby". Growing up, his idols were John Terry, Nemanja Vidić, Rio Ferdinand, and Vincent Kompany, whom he looked to emulate, as he idolized playing in the Premier League. He would play football wherever he could on the streets or in his house with his brother Ivan.

Club career

Benfica B
Dias started his career at local club Estrela da Amadora after being brought to the club by a close family member. Dias initially played as a striker, before switching to defence, due to his team being losing by two goals during a match. Before moving to Benfica's youth academy in 2008, where he played initially as a midfielder, before to central defence for the junior side until 2015. In the same year, on 30 September, he made his professional debut with Benfica B in a 2015–16 LigaPro match against Chaves. On 7 March 2016, Rui Vitória called 18-year-old Dias for Benfica's UEFA Champions League Round of 16-second leg tie against Zenit Saint Petersburg after three of his four main centre-backs were unable to make the trip to Russia. The following season he helped the B team finish fourth; the club's highest ever position obtained in the second division. He also helped the junior team reach the final of the 2016–17 UEFA Youth League.

Benfica

On 16 September 2017, Dias debuted for the first team in a Primeira Liga match against Boavista. After two months of impressive displays, including two games against Manchester United in the Champions League, he underwent surgery due to appendicitis, sidelining him for a month. He scored his first goal for Benfica in a Taça da Liga encounter (2–2) against Vitória de Setúbal on 29 December 2017. On 3 February 2018, he scored his first goal in the Primeira Liga against Rio Ave (5–1). At the end of the season, he was voted Primeira Liga's best young player of the year.

After heavy speculation linking Dias to a big money move to French side Lyon, he extended his contract with Benfica until 2023. On 2 November 2019, Dias played his 100th game for the club and scored the opening goal against Rio Ave in a 2-0 home victory.

On 26 September 2020, Dias scored the opening goal against Moreirense in a 2–0 win. After the game, manager Jorge Jesus admitted that it was probably his last game for the club.

Manchester City

2020–21: Debut season and European final

Dias signed for English Premier League club Manchester City on 29 September 2020 on a six-year contract, with an initial fee reported of €68 million (£61.64 million) that could rise to €71.6 million with performance bonuses, plus Nicolás Otamendi being sent to Benfica in part-exchange for €15 million bringing the net cost of the transaction to €56.6 million (£51 million). On 3 October 2020, Dias made his league debut for City in a 1–1 away draw against Leeds United.

Dias was named the Manchester City Player of the Month for November 2020, following a series of very strong defensive performances. On 27 February 2021, Dias scored his first goal for City in a 2–1 home league win over West Ham United. He was praised as being a key factor in Manchester City regaining the Premier League title that season by bringing composure, leadership and stability back to the defence. Dias won the FWA Footballer of the Year for the 2020–21 season, who described him as a "comfortable winner" ahead of Harry Kane and Kevin De Bruyne, and becoming the first defender to win the award since Steve Nicol in the 1988–89 season. He was also named Manchester City's Player of the Season and the Premier League Player of the Season.

2021–22: Second Premier League title
On 15 September 2021, Dias captained Manchester City for the first time, providing an assist for Jack Grealish in a 6–3 home Champions League win against RB Leipzig. On 1 December, Dias opened the scoring in Manchester City's 2–1 victory over Aston Villa, with his first goal from outside the box in his career.

On 4 March 2022, Manchester City manager Pep Guardiola announced that Dias had suffered an hamstring injury, his first injury in five years, leading him to miss two months of the season, which included the second Manchester Derby of the season, Manchester City's second leg of their Champions League round of 16 tie against Sporting CP and Portugal's qualification play-offs for the 2022 FIFA World Cup. He made his return from injury on 20 April, replacing Nathan Aké in the 46th minute in a 3–0 victory over Brighton & Hove Albion. On 7 May, Dias suffered another hamstring injury during a match against Newcastle United, sidelining him for the remainder of the season.

International career

Youth
Dias represented the Under-17 side at the 2014 UEFA European Under-17 Championship. Two years later, he captained the Under-19 squad at the 2016 UEFA European Under-19 Championship. The following year, he captained the Under-20 side at the 2017 U-20 World Cup, which lost to Uruguay 5–4 on penalties in the quarterfinals. On 5 September 2017, he made his debut for the Under-21s in a 2019 UEFA European Under-21 Championship qualification match against Wales.

Senior
Dias was called up to the senior side by Portugal manager Fernando Santos on 15 March 2018, ahead of international friendlies against Egypt and the Netherlands. However, four days later he was dropped from the squad after picking up right ankle sprain. On 17 May 2018, Dias was named in Portugal's 23-man squad for the FIFA World Cup in Russia. Eleven days later, he made his international debut in a friendly against Tunisia. Despite being present at the World Cup, he did not feature in any of Portugal's four matches in the competition.

Following the World Cup, Dias began establishing himself in the central defense, overtaking José Fonte's place alongside Pepe, featuring in all of Portugal's 2018–19 UEFA Nations League matches, helping Portugal reach the 2019 UEFA Nations League Final on home soil. On 9 June, Portugal defeated the Netherlands 1–0 in the tournament's final, with Dias being named man of the match. For his performances throughout the competition, he was named in the "Team of the Tournament".

On 17 November, Dias scored his first international goals during the 2020-21 UEFA Nations League, netting a brace in a 3–2 victory against Croatia.

He was selected to the squad for the UEFA Euro 2020. On 19 June 2021, he scored an own goal in the 35th minute in a 2–4 loss against Germany in the UEFA Euro 2020. He appeared in all of Portugal's matches, being eventually eliminated at the round of 16, following a 1–0 loss against Belgium.

In October 2022, he was named in Portugal's preliminary 55-man squad for the 2022 FIFA World Cup in Qatar, being included in the final 26-man squad for the tournament.

Style of play
Dias is a physically strong, right-footed centre-back, who usually features on the left-hand side of central defence, due to being comfortable at passing the ball with both feet. He is able to pass in different directions, whether to a teammate on the same side as him, or switching it to the opposing side or making vertical line-breaking passes. Combining his two-footedness with a very good passing range, Dias can dictate play in any direction from the back. Dias’ strength on the ball when shielding it away from forwards running down his channel. Dias is very calm on the ball too and rarely finds himself in a heap of pressure. Dias is extremely proficient at passing, especially in longer passes, as his passing quality and ability is able to help his team retain possession. Dias is also dominant in the air, winning most of his aerial duels, as he looks to target his teammates and find them on a regular basis. Dias also uses his size to help him contest well in tackles, as he also his great at bodying up on players to win the ball back. He has a good-timing as he is able to anticipate a player's action or react for a "last-ditch" challenge.

His Manchester City manager Pep Guardiola, stated that "Dias a center back who leads the defensive line and in doing so helps others to make good decisions, the same happens in relation to midfielders [...] he is a player capable of living every moment of the game [...] always being focused on what he has to do and he makes his partner better." José Mourinho would praise Dias as the "best centre-back in world [...] for the Premier League, [he's] gaining another level of experience, knowledge".

Former Manchester United defender Gary Neville, stated that "Dias is the type of player who makes the whole team feel safe." Meanwhile, former Liverpool defender Jamie Carragher would compare Dias to legendary Barcelona defender Carles Puyol, stating that "the amount of interceptions" during a UEFA Champions League match reminded him of legendary Premier League defender John Terry, while also praising his "leadership skills".

Personal life 
Dias dated Portuguese pop star April Ivy from 2018 until September 2021.

Career statistics

Club

International

As of match played 10 December 2022. Portugal score listed first, score column indicates score after each Dias goal.

Honours
Benfica
Primeira Liga: 2018–19
Supertaça Cândido de Oliveira: 2019
UEFA Youth League runner-up: 2016–17

Manchester City
Premier League: 2020–21, 2021–22
EFL Cup: 2020–21
UEFA Champions League runner-up: 2020–21

Portugal
UEFA Nations League: 2018–19

Individual
UEFA European Under-19 Championship Team of the Tournament: 2016
Cosme Damião Awards – Revelation of the Year: 2017
Primeira Liga Best Young Player of the Year: 2017–18
UEFA Nations League Finals Team of the Tournament: 2019
Primeira Liga Defender of the Month: March 2018, October/November 2019
Primeira Liga Team of the Year: 2019–20
FWA Footballer of the Year: 2020–21
PFA Premier League Team of the Year: 2020–21
Manchester City Player of the Year: 2020–21
UEFA Champions League Squad of the Season: 2020–21
Premier League Player of the Season: 2020–21
ESM Team of the Year: 2020–21
UEFA Champions League Defender of the Season: 2020–21
IFFHS Men's World Team: 2021
FIFA FIFPro World11: 2021

References

External links

Profile at the Manchester City F.C. website
Profile at the Portuguese Football Federation website 

1997 births
Living people
People from Amadora
Portuguese footballers
Portugal youth international footballers
Portugal under-21 international footballers
Portugal international footballers
Association football defenders
S.L. Benfica B players
S.L. Benfica footballers
Manchester City F.C. players
Liga Portugal 2 players
Primeira Liga players
Premier League players
2018 FIFA World Cup players
UEFA Euro 2020 players
2022 FIFA World Cup players
UEFA Nations League-winning players
Portuguese expatriate footballers
Expatriate footballers in England
Portuguese expatriate sportspeople in England
Sportspeople from Lisbon District